Knifeandfork is an art collaborative formed in 2004 by American artists Brian House and Sue Huang.  Knifeandfork projects are concerned with the critical reconfiguration of media structures and contexts and the group is known for their unconventional use of mobile and new media in their artworks.

Knifeandfork work has been shown at the Museum of Contemporary Art, Los Angeles in 2009 under the Engagement Party program, the Beall Center for Art + Technology at the University of California, Irvine, and the Kulturhuset, Stockholm. Knifeandfork received a 2008 commission from Rhizome.

References

External links 
 
 MOCA Engagement Party website

American artist groups and collectives
New media art
Arts organizations established in 2004
2004 establishments in the United States